The 1979 New Zealand Grand Prix was a race held at the Pukekohe Park Raceway on 6 January 1979.  The race had 15 starters.

It was the 25th New Zealand Grand Prix. The race was won by Italian Teo Fabi for the first time in the March 782. The rest of the podium was completed by Australian Larry Perkins and New Zealander Brett Riley.

Classification

Qualifying

Race

References

Grand Prix
New Zealand Grand Prix
January 1979 sports events in New Zealand